Kapelln is a market municipality in the Sankt Pölten-Land district, Lower Austria, Austria. 10.29% of the municipality are forested. Kapelln is subdivided into the Katastralgemeinden Etzersdorf, Kapelln, Katzenberg, Mitterau, Mitterkilling, Oberkilling, Obermiesting, Pönning, Panzing, Rapoltendorf, Rassing, Thalheim, Unterau, Unterkilling and Untermiesting. There are 102 agricultural companies, and 586 jobs.

Population

References

External links
Official website

Cities and towns in St. Pölten-Land District